The Tomateros de Culiacán are a professional baseball team in the Mexican Pacific League based in Culiacán, Sinaloa. The team was founded in 1965 as part of the Sonora-Sinaloa League.

History
Professional baseball in Culiacán dates back to 1945, when the first team was created the Tacuarineros. This club played in the now-defunct Liga de la Costa del Pacífico (Pacific Coast League). Tomateros de Culiacán was founded in 1965 and started playing in the Liga de la Costa (Coastal League), this league is also now defunct.

The Tomateros won their most recent championship on January, 30th 2021(2020-21 season). They defeated the Naranjeros de Hermosillo in seven games, bringing their total to 13 championships. It also marked the second time in their history that they won consecutive titles.

2001–2002 season
The 2001–2002 season was a gold year not only for the Tomateros, but also for México, as they won the 2002 Caribbean Series held at Caracas, Venezuela with big leaguers as Rodrigo López, Oliver Perez, Luis Ayala, José Silva and Benji Gil, as well as with Adán Amezcua, who earned Series MVP honors.

Honours

Mexican Pacific League championships
The Tomateros have won 13 Mexican Pacific League Championships. Their most recent one came in the 2020–21 season, when they defeated the Naranjeros de Hermosillo in seven games under manager Benji Gil.

Caribbean Series championships
The Tomateros have won the Caribbean Series twice in 1996 and 2002, both under Francisco Estrada.

Roster

Notable players

Adán Amezcua
Luis Ayala
Salomé Barojas
Rigo Beltrán
Marlon Byrd
Luis Cruz
Francisco Estrada
Eric Farris
Karim García
Benji Gil
Esteban Loaiza
Aurelio López
Rodrigo López
Joey Meneses
Sid Monge
Art Pennington
Óliver Pérez
Dennys Reyes
Vicente Romo
Ricardo Rincón
Darrell Sherman
José Silva
Gorkys Hernández

Notes

References

External links 

Culiacan Tomateros
Sports teams in Sinaloa
Baseball teams established in 1965
1965 establishments in Mexico
Sport in Cancún